Baba Kuseh-ye Sofla (also Romanized as Bābā Kūseh-ye Soflá; also known as Bābā Kūseh) is a village in Qalkhani Rural District, Gahvareh District, Dalahu County, Kermanshah Province, Iran. At the 2006 census, its population was 92, in 19 families.

References 

Populated places in Dalahu County